The Renault 6 is a C-segment small family car manufactured and marketed by the French automaker Renault between 1968 and 1986.

The Renault 6 (R6) was launched at the 1968 Paris Motor Show, and was intended to be an upmarket alternative to the Renault 4 that would compete with the Citroën Ami 6 and the recently launched Citroën Dyane. It used a similar dashboard-mounted gear-lever and over-the-engine linkage to that used in the Renault 4 and the small Citroëns with which it competed. The R6 used the R4 platform as well as its  engine and was technically near-identical, but its hatchback body was larger and more modern. Visually it resembled the larger Renault 16.

The R6 was produced in France from October 1968 until 1980, continuing elsewhere until 1986.

Development
In its first two years of production, the R6 was criticised by the press for the R4-derived engine's lack of power in the heavier R6. In part because of this, the R6 had worse fuel economy than the larger and outdated Renault 8, which had a bigger engine and better performance as well.

1970

A variant of the R6 using the 1.1 litre Cléon-Fonte engine (an engine used in the Renault 8 since 1962) was unveiled at the 1970 Paris Motor Show and was widely regarded as a big improvement. The smaller engined model continued to be available until June 1979; it was sold as the Renault 6 L after August 1977.

The new car also had higher equipment levels as well a new gearbox, cooling system and front disc brakes. The new cooling system necessitated a supplementary grille beneath the original one (in the place occupied by the license plate of the R6-850), while the disc brakes meant slightly redesigned rims with openings in them. For the Spanish market the R6 was made available with a  engine, due to vehicles over  receiving higher taxation under Spanish regulations. Later, a  engine was fitted, and from 1981 the  unit appeared in the 6 GTL. The one-litre version has  DIN and this engine was also fitted to Spanish-built 5s and 7s. The R6 continued to be built in Spain until 1986, with a total of 328,000 cars built there.

In 1973 the Teilhol/ACL-built 6 Rodéo appeared. This was an open, plastic-bodied utility vehicle in the style of the Citroën Méhari, which was sold by selected Renault dealers. A four-wheel-drive system by Sinpar was also available to the Rodéo as well as the 6 saloon.

Facelift

In June 1973 the R6 was revamped with square headlights, new rear lights, a plastic grille, and new bumpers. The front indicator lights also moved from between the bumper and the headlights to the bumper itself. The mechanicals remained untouched. In 1978 there was a very mild facelift, with a black grille being the most obvious change.

International production

Production and sales in France and most of Europe ended in 1980 with no direct successor, but in Spain and Argentina the car was still produced and sold until 1986. Renault had launched a similar-sized hatchback, the Renault 14, in 1976 - aiming it directly at Volkswagen's highly successful new Golf, which popularised the hatchback bodystyle on cars of this size more than any other model in Europe at this time.

In Argentina, where the car was built by IKA-Renault, the original design (without the additional grille seen on European 1100s) continued until it received a facelift in 1978 along with a name change to "6 GTL". This meant a one-piece black grille, including the headlight surrounds, as well as black bumpers. Meanwhile, a 1397 cc engine (M1400) with  SAE was fitted to the Argentinian-made cars. In total, 80,869 R6s were built in Argentina, with the pre-facelift model accounting for 57,534 (71 percent) of the total.

In Colombia the car was discontinued in 1984, when the Renault 9 started production.

References

External links

Club Renault 4 5 6 y 7 de España

6
Front-wheel-drive vehicles
Subcompact cars
Hatchbacks
1970s cars
1980s cars
Cars introduced in 1968
Cars of Argentina